Bon Abbas (also Romanized as Bon ‘Abbās; also known as Bon ‘Abbās-e Laţīf) is a village in Afrineh Rural District, Mamulan District, Pol-e Dokhtar County, Lorestan Province, Iran. At the 2006 census, its population was 55, in 12 families.

References 

Towns and villages in Pol-e Dokhtar County